Tamil Nadu Minerals Limited (TAMIN) is a state-government undertaking of Government of Tamil Nadu located in the Indian state of Tamil Nadu. It is the authority and contractor of granite and stone quarries in Tamil Nadu. TAMIN received the national e-governance award for developing Quarry Management System (QMS) at the 18th national e-governance conference held at Gandhi Nagar in Gujarat 2015.

TAMIN operation
 Granite Processing Factories at Manali (near Chennai) and Madhepalli (near Krishnagiri)
 Graphite Mines & Beneficiation Plant Around Sivagangai
 Mining and processing Vermiculite, a non-metallic versatile mineral at Sevathur Village, Thirupathur Taluk, Vellore District

Records in Sales 
Highest ever sales from the inception in the year 1979 of the company has been achieved in Black Granite Rs.91.07 Crores, Limestone Rs.28.62 Crores, Graphite Flakes Rs.28.35 Crores, Indian Standard Sand Rs.6.13 Crores and Exfoliated Vermiculite Rs.1.82 crores during 2013-14.

References

External links 
TAMIN - Official Website

Companies based in Chennai
Mining companies of India
Government-owned companies of India
Mining in Tamil Nadu
1978 establishments in Tamil Nadu
Indian companies established in 1978